Rob Boyer (born September 5, 1968) is an American politician who served in the Kansas House of Representatives as a Republican from the 38th district from 2003 to 2004. Boyer was elected in 2002, and declined to run for re-election in 2004; he was succeeded by fellow Republican Anthony Brown.

References

Republican Party members of the Kansas House of Representatives
Living people
1968 births
21st-century American politicians
Politicians from Olathe, Kansas
People from Kingman, Kansas